Brett D. Morgen (born October 11, 1968) is an American documentary filmmaker. His directorial credits include The Kid Stays in the Picture (2002), Crossfire Hurricane (2012), Kurt Cobain: Montage of Heck (2015), Jane (2017), and Moonage Daydream (2022).

Early life 
Morgen was born October 11, 1968, in Los Angeles, California. He was named after USC football lineman Britt Williams, who was team captain in 1961, but his parents misspelled the name. He was raised in the San Fernando Valley, primarily in Studio City, where his father worked as a high school physical education teacher. According to Morgen, he was an avid movie fan from a young age, and knew he wanted to be a filmmaker. He attended the Crossroads School in Santa Monica, California.

Morgen attended Hampshire College in Amherst, Massachusetts, where he earned a B.A. in history in 1987, before graduating with an MFA in filmmaking from New York University in 1991.

Career
Morgen made Ollie's Army while a student at New York University. The film focuses on the exploits of the James Madison University college Republicans during Oliver North's senatorial campaign of 1994.

On the Ropes was nominated for an Academy Award in 2000 for Best Documentary.  The boxing documentary was directed by Morgen and Nanette Burstein, and examined the lives of three aspiring prizefighters and their coach.  The film won Outstanding Directorial Achievement in Documentary by the Directors Guild of America. 

The Kid Stays in the Picture is a documentary biopic about film producer Robert Evans, focusing on his major hits, like The Godfather, and his tumultuous personal life.  Once again, Morgen teamed with Nanette Burstein. 

Chicago 10 is a film about the Chicago Eight.  The film uses animation and celebrity voice-overs from Hank Azaria, Dylan Baker, Nick Nolte, Mark Ruffalo, Roy Scheider, Liev Schreiber, James Urbaniak, and Jeffrey Wright. 

June 17th, 1994 aired on ESPN as an episode of 30 for 30 and featured on-air commentary by Morgen.  It was the only 30 for 30 episode to date that included no interviews or voice-overs, consisting solely of the actual TV footage on June 17, 1994.  This was the date of the O. J. Simpson slow-moving police chase, and the other important sports stories of that day that were mostly ignored, due to the American public's fascination with Simpson. 

Next, Morgan directed Crossfire Hurricane (2012), a documentary on The Rolling Stones, followed by the Kurt Cobain documentary film Kurt Cobain: Montage of Heck (2017). His next film was Jane (2017), which follows the life of primatologist Jane Goodall, produced by National Geographic.

Morgen began working on the David Bowie documentary Moonage Daydream in 2017. The film was released theatrically in 2022 after premiering at the Cannes Film Festival.

Personal life
Morgen is married to filmmaker Debra Eisenstadt, with whom he has three children: Sky, Max and Jasper.

On January 5, 2017, while working on the film Moonage Daydream, Morgen suffered a near-fatal heart attack and flatlined three times while receiving medical care. The heart attack resulted in Morgen being in a coma for a week, but he survived. In a 2022 interview, Morgen attributed his heart attack to years of smoking, stress, and lack of exercise.

Filmography

Feature-length films
 Ollie's Army (1996)
 On the Ropes (1999) (Academy Award for Best Documentary Feature nomination)
 The Kid Stays in the Picture (2002)
 The Sweet Science (2003)
 Chicago 10 (2007) 
 Truth in Motion (2010)
 June 17th, 1994 (2010) (30 for 30)
 Crossfire Hurricane (2012)
 Kurt Cobain: Montage of Heck (2015) (Primetime Emmy Award for Outstanding Directing for a Documentary/Nonfiction Program nomination)
 Jane (2017) (Primetime Emmy Award for Outstanding Directing for a Documentary/Nonfiction Program winner) 
 Moonage Daydream (2022)

Television series
 On Tour (1997)
 Say It Loud (2001)
 "Nimrod Nation" (2007) Won Peabody Award (2008)
 Marvel's Runaways (2017)

Awards and nominations
{| class="wikitable"
|-
! Year
! Title
! Award
! Result
|-
|rowspan=14| 2018 || rowspan=19 | Jane || Cinema for Peace International Green Film Award 
| 
|-
| BAFTA Film Award for Best Documentary 
|  
|-
| Cinema Eye Audience Choice Award 
|  
|-
| Copenhagen International Documentary Festival Politiken's Audience Award 
| 
|-
| Gold Derby Award for Best Documentary Feature 
| 
|-
| International Online Cinema Award for Best Documentary 
| 
|-
| OFTA Best Documentary Picture 
| 
|-
| Primetime Emmy for Outstanding Directing for Nonfiction Programming 
|  
|-
| Primetime Emmy for Outstanding Writing for a Nonfiction Program 
| 
|-
| Primetime Emmy for Outstanding Picture Editing for Nonfiction Programming 
| 
|-
| Primetime Emmy for Exceptional Merit in Documentary Filmmaking 
| 
|-
| Producers Guild of America Award for Outstanding Producer of Documentary Theatrical Motion Pictures 
| 
|-
| Thessaloniki Documentary Film Festival WWF Award 
| 
|-
| Writers Guild of America Award for Best Documentary Screenplay 
| 
|-
| rowspan=5 |2017 || Amsterdam International Film Festival Audience Favorite Award 
| 
|-
| Awards Circuit Community Award for Best Documentary Feature 
| 
|-
| BFI London Film Festival Grierson Award for Best Documentary 
| 
|-
| Zelda Penzel Giving Voice to the Voiceless Award 
| 
|-
| Philadelphia Film Festival Student Choice Award 
| 
|-
| rowspan=5 |2016 || rowspan=11 | Kurt Cobain: Montage of Heck 
| American Cinema Editors Eddie Award for Best Edited Documentary Feature
| 
|-
| Cinema Eye Audience Choice Award
| 
|-
| Cinema Eye Honors Award for Outstanding Achievement in Editing
| 
|-'
| Seattle Film Critics Award
| 
|-
| Writers Guild of America Award for Best Documentary Screenplay
| 
|-
| rowspan=6 | 2015 || Ashland Independent Film Award for Best Editing: Feature Length Documentary 
| 
|-
| International Documentary Association Creative Recognition Award for Best Editing
| 
|-
| Primetime Emmy for Outstanding Picture Editing for Nonfiction Programming
| 
|-
| Primetime Emmy for Outstanding Directing for Nonfiction Programming
| 
|-
| Primetime Emmy for Outstanding Documentary or Nonfiction Special
| 
|-
| Primetime Emmy for Outstanding Writing for Nonfiction Programming
| 
|-
| 2013
| Crossfire Hurricane
| FOCAL Award for Best Use of Footage in a Production Featuring Music
| 
|-
| rowspan=1 |2009 || rowspan=4 | Chicago 10
| Writers Guild of America Award for Best Documentary Screenplay
| 
|-
| rowspan=2 |2008 || Cinema Eye Honors Award for Outstanding Achievement in Production
| 
|-
| SLFCA Award Best Animated Film
| 
|-
| rowspan=1 |2007 || Silver Hugo Award for Best Documentary Feature
| 
|-
| rowspan=2 |2003 || rowspan=2 | The Kid Stays in the Picture
| International Online Cinema Award for Best Documentary
| 
|-
| OFTA Film Award
| 
|-
| rowspan=3 |2000 || rowspan=9 | On the Ropes
| Academy Awards Best Documentary Feature
|  
|- 
| Directors Guild of America Award for Outstanding Directorial Achievement in Documentary
| 
|-
| Film Independent Spirit Truer Than Fiction Award
| 
|-
| rowspan=6 | 1999 || International Documentary Association Award for Best Documentary Feature
| 
|-
| Silver Spire Award for Film & Video - Society and Culture
| 
|-
| Sundance Film Festival Special Jury Prize for Documentary
| 
|-
| Sundance Film Festival Grand Jury Prize for Documentary
| 
|-
| Taos Talking Picture Festival Land Grant Award
| 
|-
| Urbanworld Film Festival Jury Prize for Best Documentary
| 
|-
| 1996
| Ollie's Army
| UFVA Film Festival First Prize
|

References

External links

 
 

1968 births
American directors
American documentary filmmakers
Collage filmmakers
Directors Guild of America Award winners
Film directors from Los Angeles
Living people
Crossroads School alumni
Hampshire College alumni
New York University alumni
People from Studio City, Los Angeles
Primetime Emmy Award winners